Henry John Sinclair, 2nd Baron Pentland    (6 June 1907 – 14 February 1984)  was the President of the Gurdjieff Foundation of New York from its formation in 1953 and the President of the Gurdjieff Foundation of California from its inception in 1955. He held both posts until his death. He also helped ensure the publication of English editions of Gurdjieff's and Ouspensky's books and worked to found Gurdjieff centers throughout North America.

The transatlantic Baron Pentland was a businessman and member of the House of Lords who spent much of his career conducting government and commercial affairs with the United States. He was director and vice president of the American British Electric Corporation

Education and career
Pentland was educated at Wellington College. He inherited the title from his father, John Sinclair, 1st Baron Pentland, in 1925, aged only eighteen. He was admitted to Trinity College, Cambridge, and graduated with an MA in 1929. He was elected President of the Cambridge Union in 1929. He qualified as a civil engineer.

During World War II he served in the British Army and later appointed Assistant Secretary of the Combined Production and Resources Board, 1944–1945 at Washington, D.C.

He was a director and vice president of the American British Electric Corporation. Known for his affiliation with the Work of G. I. Gurdjieff, he became president of the American Gurdjieff Foundation upon its establishment in 1953, retaining the position until his death in New York in 1984.

Family
Lord Pentland married Lucy Elisabeth Babington Smith, daughter of Sir Henry Babington Smith on 11 September 1941; the couple had one daughter, Mary Sinclair (born 21 November 1942).

Books by Lord Pentland
Exchanges Within; Questions from Everyday Life; Selected Meetings with John Pentland in California. 1955-1984. Continuum: New York. 1997.

References

External links 
 Eminent Gurdjieffians: Lord Pentland, by James Moore
 Gurdjieff International Review on Pentland
 Introductions to the Ideas of Gurdjieff: Talks of John Pentland

1907 births
1984 deaths
Barons in the Peerage of the United Kingdom
People educated at Wellington College, Berkshire
Presidents of the Cambridge Union
English expatriates in the United States

Students of George Gurdjieff